The Mitchell colonial by-election, 1865 was a by-election held on 25 March 1865 in the electoral district of Mitchell for the Queensland Legislative Assembly.

History
Under the Additional Members Act 1864, the seats of Clermont, Kennedy, Maryborough, Mitchell, Rockhampton and Warrego were created. By-elections to fill the new seats were held on 1 February 1865 (Maryborough and Rockhampton), on 18 March 1865 (Clermont and Kennedy) and on 25 March 1865 (Mitchell and Warrego). John Gore Jones won in Mitchell.

See also
 Members of the Queensland Legislative Assembly, 1863–1867

References

1865 elections in Australia
Queensland state by-elections
1860s in Queensland